Utricularia longifolia is a large perennial carnivorous plant that belongs to the genus Utricularia. U. longifolia, a terrestrial or lithophyte species, is endemic to Brazil.

See also 
 List of Utricularia species

References 

Carnivorous plants of South America
Flora of Brazil
longifolia